Enzo Fittipaldi da Cruz (born 18 July 2001) is a Brazilian-American racing driver, who is currently competing in the FIA Formula 2 Championship with Carlin. After signing with Carlin, he became a member of the Red Bull Junior Team in November 2022, and was a previous member of the Ferrari Driver Academy.

He is grandson of two-time Formula 1 champion Emerson Fittipaldi by his daughter Juliana and Carlos da Cruz, and brother of racing driver Pietro Fittipaldi.

Career

Karting 
Not much is known about Fittipaldi's karting career, he took a high of sixth place in the 2009 USA Rotax Grand Nationals in the Micro Max category. Fitttipaldi also won the East Coast Karting Championship in 2014.

Ginetta Junior Championship 
In 2016, Fittipaldi graduated to car racing in the Ginetta Junior Championship with Douglas Motorsport. He finished 18th in the championship with a best race finish of eighth, despite missing the final three rounds.

Formula 4

2017 
In 2017, Fittipaldi signed with Prema Powerteam for the Italian F4 Championship. He was massively outperformed by teammate and eventual champion Marcus Armstrong. Fittipaldi achieved a highest finish of fifth place four times, leading him to finish ninth in the championship. In the 2017 ADAC Formula 4 Championship, Fittipaldi competed as a guest driver.

2018 
In 2018, Fittipaldi remained with Prema Powerteam for the Italian F4 Championship. In the first race of the year, he duly went to take his maiden single-seater victory at Adria, later winning again in the third race. However, he would not win for another two rounds, and lost the championship lead heading into Misano. There, he would take all available points by winning all three races which saw him regain the championship lead. Despite not winning for the next two rounds, a double Mugello win saw him seal the title at the final race.

In ADAC Formula 4, in a season which was dominated by eventual champion Lirim Zendeli, Fittipaldi's sole win came at the second Hockenheimring round. He also picked up eight other podiums throughout the season and finished the year third overall.

Formula Regional European Championship 
In 2019 Fittipaldi competed in the 2019 Formula Regional European Championship for the Prema Powerteam alongside Frederik Vesti and Olli Caldwell. Fittipaldi's opening to the season was clean, standing on the podium on all races during the opening three rounds. This included a win in just his second race, although he did not stand on the step of the rostrum due to previous winner Olli Caldwell being disqualified post-race. Following that however, he could only score five more podiums in the remaining five rounds, one of which was at Imola where he took another win. Overall, he won two races, scored 11 more podiums and finished runner-up in the championship, only behind Vesti. He also helped his team win the team championship.

FIA Formula 3 Championship

2020 
During the 2019 F3 post-season testing, Fittipaldi was invited to drive for Prema Racing during the second day. At the start of January 2020, Fittipaldi was announced to be driving for HWA Racelab in the 2020 FIA Formula 3 Championship, partnering Jake Hughes and Red Bull junior Jack Doohan. He started his season strong at the Red Bull Ring despite qualifying 29th, he charged forward in both races to take his first points with ninth in Race 2. The third round in Budapest saw Fittipaldi make another Race 2 charge, to finish ninth yet again and claiming points. A penalty robbed him from another point in the second Silverstone round, but improved his personal best result to eighth in the following Barcelona round. In Spa-Francorchamps despite not earning points, Fittipaldi made another Race 2 charge, climbing 14 places from 26th to end 12th. He scored another ninth place in Monza during Race 1, and another strong result was lost due to a puncture following contact with Lirim Zendeli in Race 2. He had his best weekend of the season in Mugello season finale, sealing an impressive fifth in qualifying, before being promoted to start fourth. He managed to secure fifth and fourth places in the races, which tripled his points tally. Fittipaldi placed 15th in the standings, eight places behind his vastly more experienced teammate Hughes, but eleven positions ahead of fellow rookie Doohan.

2021 

In May 2021, it was announced that Fittipaldi would switch to Charouz Racing System in the 2021 FIA Formula 3 Championship, partnering Reshad de Gerus and Logan Sargeant. By finishing 12th in Race 1, He scored reverse pole for Race 2. There, he battled with David Schumacher until lap 15, where he collided with him, sending Schumacher out of the race. A lap later, he would slow and retire with electrical issues. Despite not scoring in Paul Ricard and his points tally remaining at zero, he stated that the Charouz atmosphere "one of the best [I've] ever felt". At the Red Bull Ring, Fittipaldi finished 11th on the road, but numerous penalties promoted to fourth, scoring his first points of the year. He finished eighth in Race 2 despite being airborne for a second. At the Hungaroring, finishing 12th in Race 1 gave him reverse pole again for Race 2. He maintained his lead, until lap 4, where Matteo Nannini passed him. Fittipaldi remained in second place and duly claimed his first F3 podium. Fittipaldi surged to finish ninth in Race 3. 

Following that however, Fittipaldi was replaced in his seat by American Hunter Yeany. Overall, Fittipaldi claimed 25 points and ended 17th in the championship.

Indy Pro 2000 Championship 
In February 2021 it was confirmed that Fittipaldi would compete in the Indy Pro 2000 Championship for RP Motorsport. However, after the first round of the season the Brazilian left the championship. In an interview with his former F3 teammate Jake Hughes in June of that year Fittipaldi confirmed that he would not be returning to the series.

FIA Formula 2 Championship

2021: Partial campaign 
In September 2021 it was announced that Fittipaldi would step up to Formula 2 to race throughout the second half of the season with Charouz Racing System, alongside compatriot Guilherme Samaia. Fittipaldi replaced David Beckmann, who was forced to vacate his seat due to financial difficulties, in the Charouz line-up. A few days before his debut weekend Fittipaldi stated that he "wasn't really expecting" his F2 call-up before it happened, but was "looking forward to [racing at Monza]".

His first round in Monza was positive, he originally finished ninth in the feature race but was demoted five seconds due to a penalty which dropped him to 11th. Another solid weekend came in Sochi, finishing the feature race 12th. At the start of December, MUSEO2.0 started to sponsor him from then on. Fittipaldi would then go on to take his first points of his Formula 2 career by finishing seventh in the second sprint race in Jeddah. 

The following day, Fittipaldi was involved in an incident at the start of the feature race in which he hit the stalled car of Théo Pourchaire from behind. Both drivers were extracted and given medical treatment, before Fittipaldi was transferred to the King Fahad Armed Forces Hospital via helicopter. Later that night his brother Pietro reported that he [Enzo] was awake, and that he had only sustained a fracture of his right heel as well as a cut above his left eye. 

Fittipaldi was not able to compete in the final round of the 2021 championship due to his injuries, being replaced for the weekend by Richard Verschoor. On 12 December 2021, the day of the Abu Dhabi feature race, Fittipaldi was discharged and soon returned to his home. Fittipaldi was 20th in the standings, with two points.

2022: Redemption 

On 16 February 2022, Fittipaldi announced that he would remain with Charouz for 2022, partnering Euroformula Open graduate Cem Bölükbaşı. Fittipaldi failed to score points in the opening two rounds, taking 11th place twice. In Imola he qualified 15th, but was demoted three places for the sprint race due to impeding, he finished the race in 12th. In the feature race, as a result of an opportunistic tyre strategy, Fittipaldi found himself in a net fifth place following the pit stops. A crash for Roy Nissany followed, and in the last laps passed Logan Sargeant and Ralph Boschung for second place, and his first F2 podium. This would become the starting point for a run of consistent points finishes. The Brazilian qualified 11th, missing out on reverse pole by 15 thousandths. He managed to take the final points' positions in eighth during the sprint race, courtesy of overtaking Jake Hughes on the fourth last lap. In the feature race, an alternate strategy he was on proved to be successful, overtaking car after car to claim sixth place. 

In Monaco, Fittipaldi qualified sixth. His races were relatively quiet, finishing the sprint race in fourth and the feature race in fifth, scoring decent points. He qualified a low 16th in Baku. His sprint race ended in disappointment, as he made a failed overtake on Jüri Vips for tenth, instead clouting the wall and damaging his suspension. In a chaotic feature race, Fittipaldi rose to sixth, thanks to a late crash from Vips. In Silverstone, he qualified ninth to start second in the sprint race. He managed to overtake reverse polesitter Jehan Daruvala in a rain-affected race on lap 5. He lost two positions to Jack Doohan and Ayumu Iwasa but nevertheless claimed a second podium in third. Fittipaldi lost on the final points position in the feature race on the last lap, being passed by Jake Hughes. At the Red Bull Ring he qualified 12th, and finished eighth after penalties were given to Iwasa and Frederik Vesti ahead. In the feature race, the right decision to put slick tyres on a drying track paid off, and was well in the top 5 following the pit stops. He eventually ended fifth, but due to penalties awarded to the drivers ahead of him, Fittipaldi was promoted to second place. 

A disappointing round in Paul Ricard a car issue meant he was confined to 14th. Worst was to come as he stalled at the start of the sprint race and retiring after colliding with Roberto Merhi, which earned a five-place grid drop. He finished tenth in the feature race and added a point, only because Richard Verschoor suffered an engine issue ahead and retired. However, Fittipaldi would experience his best round of the season in Hungary, qualifying in ninth place. He took the lead at the start from Doohan in the sprint race into the first corner, but locked up at the next turn and fell to third place. He would stay there for the remainder of the race and collect another podium. In the feature race, he was up to fifth by lap 4, and made a successful overcut during the pit stops that saw him jump to second place behind Théo Pourchaire. third and second respectively in Hungary. Heading into the summer break, the Brazilian sat fourth in the standings with 100 points.

In Spa-Francorchamps, he had his best qualifying yet, qualifying second. After finishing the sprint race in 13th, he dropped two places to fourth at the start of the feature race, and was involved in a tight battle with Liam Lawson and eventually finished fifth. However, he was demoted to tenth place after gaining a place on Lawson off-track. In Zandvoort, he qualified 13th and finished the sprint race in the same position. In a hectic feature race, Fittipaldi claimed fifth place, staying out of trouble.
In Monza, he qualified 16th. After an uneventful sprint race where he ended 12th, a better feature race saw him pit at the right time, and end up in fourth place, but was promoted to third as Iwasa was disqualified ahead. A disappointing Abu Dhabi round saw Fittipaldi end his season with a collision with Jehan Daruvala in the sprint race, and 14th in the feature race. Fittipaldi ended the 2022 season in eighth place in the standings, scoring 126 points and six podium finishes.

After the end of the campaign, his brother Pietro revealed that Fittipaldi had to undergo brain surgery as a result of a brain haemorrhage, which nearly caused him to miss the season opener.

2023 
At the conclusion of the 2022 season, Fittipaldi tested for Carlin during the Abu Dhabi post-season test. In January 2023, the Brazilian was confirmed to be driving for the British outfit for the 2023 Formula 2 Championship alongside fellow Red Bull junior Zane Maloney.

Formula One 
In November 2016, Fittipaldi was among five drivers invited to join the Ferrari Driver Academy and was confirmed as a member alongside Marcus Armstrong the following month. In the winter of 2021 the Brazilian and Ferrari parted ways.

In November 2022 it was announced that Fittipaldi would join the Red Bull Junior Team as a full member.

Karting record

Karting career summary

Racing record

Racing career summary

† As Fittipaldi was a guest driver, he was ineligible for points.

Complete Ginetta Junior Championship results 
(key) (Races in bold indicate pole position) (Races in italics indicate fastest lap)

Complete Italian F4 Championship results 
(key) (Races in bold indicate pole position) (Races in italics indicate fastest lap)

Complete ADAC Formula 4 Championship results 
(key) (Races in bold indicate pole position) (Races in italics indicate fastest lap)

† As Fittipaldi was a guest driver, he was ineligible to score points.

Complete Formula Regional European Championship results 
(key) (Races in bold indicate pole position; races in italics indicate fastest lap)

Complete Macau Grand Prix results

Complete FIA Formula 3 Championship results 
(key) (Races in bold indicate pole position) (Races in italics indicate fastest lap)

Complete FIA Formula 2 Championship results 
(key) (Races in bold indicate pole position) (Races in italics indicate points for the fastest lap of top ten finishers)

* Season still in progress.

References

External links 

 

Living people
2001 births
Racing drivers from Miami
Brazilian racing drivers
Italian F4 Championship drivers
Italian F4 champions
ADAC Formula 4 drivers
Enzo Fittipaldi
FIA Formula 3 Championship drivers
Indy Pro 2000 Championship drivers
American emigrants to Brazil
American sportspeople of Brazilian descent
Formula Regional European Championship drivers
Ginetta Junior Championship drivers
Prema Powerteam drivers
HWA Team drivers
RP Motorsport drivers
Charouz Racing System drivers
FIA Formula 2 Championship drivers
NACAM F4 Championship drivers
Carlin racing drivers